Câmpani is a commune in Bihor County, Crișana, Romania. Its earliest attested documentation dates to 1600. It is situated in the southern part of the county, near the Apuseni Mountains, on the banks of the Băița River. Câmpani is situated at roughly equal distances to 3 towns: Nucet (5 km), Ștei (6 km), Vașcău (8 km), and 88 km from the county capital Oradea.

Administration
The commune is composed of five villages: Câmpani, Fânațe (Fonóháza), Hârsești (Herzafalva), Sighiștel (Kisszegyesd) and Valea de Sus (Felsőfeketevölgy).

The central village itself is divided into Câmpani de Jos (Lower Câmpani) and Câmpani de Sus (Upper Câmpani); these names are received from where the houses are situated, on the upper or lower course of the river. From the administrative point of view, there is only commune. In the past there were two villages. Now the only difference is that there are 2 bus stops, one in every part. 
Theoretically there is only one street in the commune, the Main street, most of which is situated along the DN 75 road. However, there are some streets not connected to the road, that received name from the inhabitants, two of which are Mierăști and Hânicău.

Education
Câmpani has 6 kindergartens, 6 elementary schools and one secondary school.
All of the school went under rehabilitation in the past years and they are now very modern ones. The local council provides a bus and a bus driver, which picks up the children from home am takes to school every morning. 
Most of the highschool students, study in Ștei a nearby town which has two highschools. Special buses are set on the route for their departure and arrival with the fees supported by the government.

Institutions
The commune contains several institutions:
5 Orthodox churches
2 Protestant churches
Town hall
Pharmacy
Police department
Small hospital
Primary and secondary schools
Community centres

There are further plans for building a village museum.

Economy
The commune does not have any large or midsized business open. Besides few grocery shops and some bars some wood production units are available. While in the past, most of the inhabitants worked at the uranium mine in Băița or at the local factory (uzină) in Ștei, today most of them work at the European Drinks or European Food factories in Rieni, Sudrigiu or Ștei. 
Agriculture was an important branch of the economy in the past, but nowadays the trend had fallen. Every house was a microfarm, with at least 2 cows, 2 pigs, 20 chicken and 1 horse. Nowadays most still own 1 or 2 pigs and some chicken; but there are some that make money from agriculture owning larger farms with 10 cows and many pigs. Some are them are shepherds with tens of sheep in the herd.

Tourism
The Natural Reservation of the Sighiștel Valley is a major tourist attraction, the valley having a beautiful and wild canyon and numerous caves. In each summer you can find tens of tourists camping there, with tents.

Another tourist attraction is the old wooden church in Fânațe, which is more than 300 years old.

Sister commune
Câmpani has a sister commune in France: Saint-Jean-en-Royans. Every year French come to Câmpani or Romanians go to France. An organisation “Europrietenia” (Eurofriendship) is dealing with the departures, being funded by its members and by the European Union.

References

Communes in Bihor County
Localities in Crișana